Elections to the Baseball Hall of Fame for 1952 followed the same rules as 1951.
The Baseball Writers' Association of America (BBWAA) voted once by mail to select from major league players retired less than 25 year and elected two, Harry Heilmann and Paul Waner.
Meanwhile, the Old-Timers Committee, with jurisdiction over earlier players and other figures, did not meet. A formal induction ceremony was held in Cooperstown, New York, on July 21, 1952, with Commissioner of Baseball Ford Frick and National League president Warren Giles in attendance.

BBWAA election 

The 10-year members of the BBWAA had the authority to select any players active in 1927 or later, provided they had not been active in 1951. Voters were instructed to cast votes for 10 candidates; any candidate receiving votes on at least 75% of the ballots would be honored with induction to the Hall.

A total of 234 ballots were cast, with 2,186 individual votes for 75 specific candidates, an average of 9.34 per ballot; 176 votes were required for election. The two candidates who received at least 75% of the vote and were elected are indicated in bold italics.

References

Sources

External links
1952 Election at www.baseballhalloffame.org

Baseball Hall of Fame balloting
1952 in baseball